The Moselstadion is a football and athletics stadium in Trier, Germany. Football club Eintracht Trier uses the stadium to host its home games. It has a capacity for 10,256 spectators.

History

In 1930, the sports facility was "On The D'Ham", as the area was still called then inaugurated. After the Second World War, the facility was named the Moselstadion. In 1998 on the occasion of the DFB Cup semi-final match against MSV Duisburg, floodlights were erected. After the promotion of Eintracht Trier to the 2. Bundesliga in the 2002-03 season, many repairs were needed. In addition, the main grandstand was expanded and a club house was built, covering the back straight. Due to the rise in visitor numbers and inadequate safety standards of the stadium, heated discussions arose about a major expansion or new construction of the stadium.

Since the relegation of the club in 2005 and later descent in the fourth-tier Regionalliga, the corresponding plans have been deferred.

Football venues in Germany
Athletics (track and field) venues in Germany
SV Eintracht Trier 05
Sport in Trier
Buildings and structures in Trier